James Blain Forshaw (30 December 1919 – 2015) was a Scottish footballer who played for Dumbarton.

Forshaw died in New Kilpatrick in 2015, at the age of 95.

References

1919 births
2015 deaths
Scottish footballers
Dumbarton F.C. players
Scottish Football League players
Association football forwards